The Mecseki narrow gauge railway is a  railway in Pécs, Hungary.

Motive Power

References

Rail transport in Hungary